David Torrance may refer to:

David Torrance (banker) (1805–1876), Canadian president of Bank of Montreal (1873–1876)
David Torrance (judge) (1840–1906), American Chief Justice of Connecticut Supreme Court
David Watt Torrance (1862–1923), Scottish medical missionary, head of first hospital in Tiberias, followed by his son, Dr. Herbert Watt Torrance (1892–1977)
David W. Torrance (born 1924), Church of Scotland minister
David Torrance (politician) (born 1961), Member of Scottish Parliament for Kirkcaldy since 2011
David Torrance (journalist) (born 1977), Scottish political commenter

See also
David Torrence (disambiguation)